Peris Chepchumba Simam (born 1968, Kapkoi near Eldoret) is a Kenyan politician. She belongs to the Orange Democratic Movement and was elected to represent the Eldoret South Constituency in the National Assembly of Kenya in the 2007 Kenyan parliamentary election.

References

Gender & Governance Programme in Kenya: Peris Chepchumba: A Brave Fighter

1968 births
Living people
Members of the National Assembly (Kenya)
Orange Democratic Movement politicians
21st-century Kenyan women politicians
21st-century Kenyan politicians